A lilu or lilû is a masculine Akkadian word for a spirit or demon.

History 
Jo Ann Scurlock and Burton R. Andersen (2005) see the origin of lilu in treatment of mental illness.

In Sumerian and Akkadian literature 
In Akkadian literature hlilu occurs. In Sumerian literature lili occurs. Dating of specific Akkadian, Sumerian, and Babylonian texts mentioning lilu (masculine), lilitu (female) and lili (female) are haphazard. In older scholarship, such as R. Campbell Thompson's The Devils and Evil Spirits of Babylonia (1904), specific text references are rarely given. An exception is K156 which mentions an ardat lili Heinrich Zimmern (1917) tentatively identified vardat lilitu KAT3, 459 as paramour of lilu.

A cuneiform inscription lists lilû alongside other wicked beings from Mesopotamian mythology and folklore:

Sumerian King List 
In the Sumerian King List the father of Gilgamesh is said to be a lilu.

'Spirit in the tree' in the Gilgamesh cycle 
Tablet XII, dated , is a later Assyrian Akkadian translation of the latter part of the Sumerian Epic of Gilgamesh. It describes a 'spirit in the tree' referred to a ki-sikil-lil-la-ke. Suggested translations for the Tablet XII 'spirit in the tree' include ki-sikil as "sacred place", lil as "spirit", and lil-la-ke as "water spirit". but also simply "owl", given that the lil builds a home in the trunk of the tree.

The ki-sikil-lil-la-ke is associated with a serpent and a zu bird. In Gilgamesh, Enkidu, and the Netherworld, a huluppu tree grows in Inanna's garden in Uruk, whose wood she plans to use to build a new throne. After ten years of growth, she comes to harvest it and finds a serpent living at its base, a Zu bird raising young in its crown, and that a ki-sikil-lil-la-ke made a house in its trunk. Gilgamesh is said to have killed the snake, and then the zu bird flew away to the mountains with its young, while the ki-sikil-lil-la-ke fearfully destroys its house and runs for the forest.

Relationship to Hebrew Lilith and lilin 
Judit M. Blair wrote a thesis on the relation of the Akkadian word lilu, or its cognates, to the Hebrew word lilith in Isaiah 34:14, which is thought to be a night bird.  The Babylonian concept of lilu may be more strongly related to the later Talmudic concept of Lilith (female) and lilin (female).

Samuel Noah Kramer (1932, published 1938) translated ki-sikil-lil-la-ke as Lilith in "Tablet XII" of the Epic of Gilgamesh. Identification of ki-sikil-lil-la-ke as Lilith is stated in Dictionary of Deities and Demons in the Bible (1999). According to a new source from Late Antiquity, Lilith appears in a Mandaic magic story where she is considered to represent the branches of a tree with other demonic figures that form other parts of the tree, though this may also include multiple "Liliths". A connection between the Gilgamesh ki-sikil-lil-la-ke and the Jewish Lilith was rejected on textual grounds by Sergio Ribichini (1978).

Notes

References 

Mesopotamian demons
Lilith